The following is a list of Teen Choice Award winners and nominees for Choice Music – Group. The award was not given in 2002 to 2009. One Direction receives the most wins with 4.

Winners and nominees

1999

2000s

2010s

References

Pop music awards
Group